The GE Honda HF120 is a small turbofan for the light business jet market, the first engine to be produced by GE Honda Aero Engines.

Development

Succeeding Honda's original HF118 prototype, the HF120 was undergoing testing in July 2008, with certification targeted for late 2009. The first engines were produced at GE's factory, but in November 2014 production shifted to Burlington, North Carolina. The U.S. Federal Aviation Administration (FAA) awarded Part 33 certification to the HF120 turbofan engine in December 2013, and production certification in 2015.

Design

The engine has a wide-chord swept fan, two-stage low-pressure compressor and counter rotating high-pressure compressor based on a titanium impeller, for a  takeoff thrust. The HF120 engine's components interact with greater efficiency by incorporating 3D aerodynamic design and its effusion-cooled combustor design emits few NOx, CO and HC. Noise levels are quieter than Stage 4 requirements.

In May 2016 time between overhaul was 2,500 h and should mature to 5,000 h; a midlife hot-section inspection isn't required and it should remain on wing 40% longer than other engines and have lower operating costs.

Operational history

Besides the HondaJet, HF120 was announced as a retrofit to the Cessna CitationJet CJ1 by Sierra Industries, in partnership with GE Honda.

In addition, Spectrum Aeronautical has announced it is planning to use HF120 for its upcoming S-40 Freedom.

Applications
 Honda HA-420 HondaJet
 Spectrum S-40 Freedom

Specifications

See also

References

External links

Medium-bypass turbofan engines
Honda engines
2000s turbofan engines
Centrifugal-flow turbojet engines